Knighton Downs and Wood is a 203.7 hectare biological Site of Special Scientific Interest in Wiltshire, notified in 1971.

Sources

 Natural England citation sheet for the site (accessed 7 April 2022)

External links
 Natural England website (SSSI information)

Sites of Special Scientific Interest in Wiltshire
Sites of Special Scientific Interest notified in 1971